William Longworth (26 September 1892 – 19 October 1969) was an Australian freestyle swimmer who competed for Australasia in the 1912 Summer Olympics.

Personal
He was born in Rix's Creek, Singleton, New South Wales, and died in Wahroonga, New South Wales.

Swimming
Longworth attended Sydney Grammar School where he excelled in athletics, swimming and rugby union. In January 1911, he won the 1320-yard freestyle in world record time at Australian Championship by 30 yards.  He defeated Cecil Healy and Frank Beaurepaire. In 1912, he won all the New South Wales and Australian freestyle championships from 100 yards to one mile. In 1912, he qualified for the final of the 100-metre freestyle, as well as for the semifinals of the 1500-metre freestyle, but due to illness he was unable to continue competing.

Military
Longworth enlisted in the First Australian Imperial Force on 13 September 1915. He served in France from November as a sergeant with the Anzac Entrenchment Battalion. He represented the A.I.F. in swimming.

References

External links
William Longworth – Australian Dictionary of Biography
Sport Reference profile

1892 births
1969 deaths
Australian male freestyle swimmers
Olympic swimmers of Australia
Olympic swimmers of Australasia
People educated at Sydney Grammar School
Swimmers at the 1912 Summer Olympics
Australian military personnel of World War I
People from the Hunter Region
Sportsmen from New South Wales